John Martyn (1948–2009) was a Scottish singer-songwriter.

John Martyn may also refer to:

John Martyn (academic) (died 1473), Master of University College, Oxford, England
John Martyn (botanist) (1699–1768), British botanist and author of Historia plantarum rariorum
John Martyn (publisher) (died 1680), London publisher and bookseller
John Martyn (schoolmaster) (1903–1984), second Headmaster of The Doon School, India
John Burton Martyn (1867–1921), Ontario physician and political figure
John Martyn (Leicester MP), MP for Leicester
John Martyn (died 1627), MP for Nottingham
John Martyn (MP for Scarborough), MP for Scarborough
John Martyn (MP for Wycombe), for Wycombe
John Martyn (priest), Dean of Bangor from 1371 to 1382

See also 
John Martin (disambiguation)
J. Thomas Marten (born 1951), American judge